Jacek Bocian (born 15 September 1976 in Kalisz) is a Polish former sprinter who specialised in the 400 metres. His biggest successes came in the Polish 4 × 400 metres relay, including gold medals at the 1999 World Championships and 2001 World Indoor Championships, as well as the silver at the 1999 World Indoor Championships. In addition, he competed at the 2000 Summer Olympics.

He has 400 metres personal best of 45.99 seconds outdoors (Kraków 2000) and 46.68 seconds indoors (Spała 1999).

Competition record

References

1976 births
Athletes (track and field) at the 2000 Summer Olympics
Living people
Polish male sprinters
Olympic athletes of Poland
Sportspeople from Kalisz
World Athletics Championships medalists
Goodwill Games medalists in athletics
Śląsk Wrocław athletes
World Athletics Indoor Championships winners
World Athletics Indoor Championships medalists
World Athletics Championships winners
Competitors at the 2001 Goodwill Games